Odd Holten (born 28 August 1940 in Øre) is a Norwegian politician for the Christian Democratic Party.

He was elected to the Norwegian Parliament from Østfold in 1989, and was re-elected on three occasions. Holten was President of the Lagting 1997–2001. His daughter Line Henriette Holten Hjemdal was elected in 2005.

Holten was a member of the executive committee of Fredrikstad city council from 1975 to 1989. In 1983–1987 he was also a member of Østfold county council.

References

1940 births
Living people
Christian Democratic Party (Norway) politicians
Members of the Storting
21st-century Norwegian politicians
20th-century Norwegian politicians